Robert Clayton Dunbar (May 6, 1878 – June 22, 1973) was an American football player and coach. He served as the head football coach at Monmouth College in Monmouth, Illinois, where he was also a player and a student. Upon graduation, he attended Cornell University in Ithaca, New York.

References

External links
 

1878 births
1973 deaths
Monmouth Fighting Scots football coaches
Monmouth Fighting Scots football players
Cornell University alumni
People from Monmouth, Illinois
Players of American football from Illinois